India competed at the 1998 Asian Games held in Bangkok, Thailand. India ranked 9th with 7 Gold medals, 11 Silver medals and 17 Bronze medals.

Medals by sport

Medalists

Gold (7)

Silver (11)

Bronze (17)

Medal Tally

References

Nations at the 1998 Asian Games
1998
Asian Games